Mikaniopsis maitlandii is a species of flowering plant in the family Asteraceae. It is found in Cameroon, Equatorial Guinea, and Nigeria. Its natural habitats are subtropical or tropical moist lowland forests and subtropical or tropical moist montane forests. It is threatened by habitat loss.

References

maitlandii
Flora of Cameroon
Flora of Equatorial Guinea
Flora of Nigeria
Vulnerable plants
Taxonomy articles created by Polbot